Valga is a rural locality (a settlement) in Samotovinskoye Rural Settlement, Velikoustyugsky District, Vologda Oblast, Russia. The population was 193 as of 2002. There are 5 streets.

Geography 
Valga is located 6 km southwest of Veliky Ustyug (the district's administrative centre) by road. Zherebyatyevo is the nearest rural locality.

References 

Rural localities in Velikoustyugsky District